Diego Armando Barrado (born 27 February 1981 in Argentina) is an Argentine footballer, who played as a midfielder.

Career 
Barrado spent time in the youth teams of River Plate and Textil Mandiyú and made his professional debut for River in 2000. In 2004, he joined Racing Club de Avellaneda where he excelled in several games. In 2005, he returned to River Plate, but played very little. In 2006, he was signed by Colón de Santa Fe by manager Leonardo Astrada, Barrado's former teammate and manager at River. However, his level again declined.

In 2007, he joined Olimpo where he played well for the team despite their relegation from the league. He again returned to River but was part of the worst season ever for the club, where they finished 20th and last for the first time in the history of the club.

External links 
 
 

1981 births
Argentine footballers
Living people
Sportspeople from Buenos Aires Province
Racing Club de Avellaneda footballers
Club Atlético River Plate footballers
Club Atlético Colón footballers
Olimpo footballers
Atlético Tucumán footballers
Boca Unidos footballers
Juventud Unida de Gualeguaychú players
Argentine Primera División players
Association football midfielders